Kalle Kustaa Matilainen (30 May 1903 - 20 March 1973) was a Finnish carpenter, metalworker and politician, born in Keitele. He was a member of the Parliament of Finland from 1956 to 1970, representing the Social Democratic Party of Finland (SDP).

References

1903 births
1973 deaths
People from Keitele
People from Kuopio Province (Grand Duchy of Finland)
Social Democratic Party of Finland politicians
Members of the Parliament of Finland (1954–58)
Members of the Parliament of Finland (1958–62)
Members of the Parliament of Finland (1962–66)
Members of the Parliament of Finland (1966–70)